David Greenhill Bryden (23 June 1927 – 30 August 2013) was an Australian rules footballer in the Victorian Football League (VFL).

Bryden was an old school ruckman-cum-back pocket recruited from Wonthaggi, Victoria who, at his prime was considered one of the best ruckmen in the Victorian Football League. Bryden played for the Victorian interstate team in 1951 and was second best on ground in the 1954 VFL Grand Final. He played for the Bulldogs between 1947 and 1955, kicking 56 goals in 147 games. After leaving Footscray he coached and played for Nhill in country Victoria for three years. He coached to finals in 2 of the 3 years. He then returned to Melbourne and played for Kensington in the Sunday league at the age of 31 for 3 seasons. He won the best and fairest in each of the 3 years at that club.

References

External links

Western Bulldogs players
Western Bulldogs Premiership players
1927 births
2013 deaths
Australian rules footballers from Victoria (Australia)
People from Wonthaggi
One-time VFL/AFL Premiership players